George Roux (1853–1929) was a French artist and book illustrator. His best-known works today are a large number of illustrations he created for the science-fiction novels of Jules Verne, in the series Les voyages extraordinaires. He was the second-most prolific illustrator of Verne's novels, after Léon Benett, drawing the illustrations for 22 novels in the original editions of Verne's works with the publisher Pierre-Jules Hetzel. The first of them was L’Épave du Cynthia (The Salvage of the Cynthia, 1885) and the last was L'Étonnante aventure de la mission Barsac (The Barsac Mission, 1919).

He also illustrated André Laurie's Axel Ebersen, the Graduate of Upsala published in instalments in volume 14 (1981–2) of the Boy's Own Paper.

References

External links 

 Gallery of illustrations of "Voyages Extraordinaires", compiled by the Science-Fiction Studies journal.

French illustrators
19th-century French painters
French male painters
20th-century French painters
20th-century male artists
1929 deaths
Jules Verne
1853 births